Pond Peak is a conspicuous ice-free peak, 1,430 m, at the south side of the mouth of Baldwin Valley in Saint Johns Range, Victoria Land, Antarctica. It was named by the Advisory Committee on Antarctic Names (US-ACAN) in 1964 after James D. Pond of the U.S. Navy, who was in charge of electronic repair and maintenance at Hallett Station in 1962.

Mountains of Victoria Land
Scott Coast